Nenad Sakić (born 15 June 1971) is a Serbian football manager and former player. He currently assistant manager Italian  club Sampdoria.

Club career
Sakić came to Napredak Kruševac in 1989 and spent five seasons with the club. He was signed by Red Star Belgrade in 1994, helping them win the championship in his debut season. During his time with the Crveno-beli, Sakić also won three consecutive national cups.

In 1997, Sakić moved abroad to Italy and signed with Serie A side Lecce. He played regularly during his only season at the club, before switching to Sampdoria. From 1998 to 2004, Sakić played 137 league games for Sampdoria, scoring once. He played two more seasons with Napredak Kruševac before retiring.

International career
Between 1998 and 2000, Sakić was capped six time for FR Yugoslavia, making his debut in a friendly against Brazil (1–1 draw).

Managerial career
In December 2008, it was announced that Sakić would be taking charge of Napredak Kruševac. He was also manager of Serbia U17, before serving as an assistant to Siniša Mihajlović during Mihajlović's managerial stints with Serbia, Sampdoria and Milan.

Career statistics

Honours
Red Star Belgrade
 First League of FR Yugoslavia: 1994–95
 FR Yugoslavia Cup: 1994–95, 1995–96, 1996–97

References

External links
 
 
 

1971 births
Living people
Sportspeople from Kruševac
Yugoslav footballers
Serbia and Montenegro footballers
Serbian footballers
Association football defenders
Serbia and Montenegro international footballers
FK Napredak Kruševac players
Red Star Belgrade footballers
U.S. Lecce players
U.C. Sampdoria players
Yugoslav Second League players
First League of Serbia and Montenegro players
Serie A players
Serie B players
Serbia and Montenegro expatriate footballers
Expatriate footballers in Italy
Serbia and Montenegro expatriate sportspeople in Italy
Serbian football managers
FK Napredak Kruševac managers
A.C. Milan non-playing staff
Red Star Belgrade non-playing staff
Serbian SuperLiga managers
Serbian expatriate football managers
Expatriate football managers in Italy
Serbian expatriate sportspeople in Italy